Israel Shear House is a historic home located at Ravena in Albany County, New York.  It was built about 1810 and is a -story, rectangular heavy timber-frame dwelling on a rubble foundation.  It is in the Federal style. The center entrance features a broad nine-panel door framed by Corinthian columns and side lights.

It was listed on the National Register of Historic Places in 1996.

References

Houses on the National Register of Historic Places in New York (state)
Federal architecture in New York (state)
Houses completed in 1810
Houses in Albany County, New York
National Register of Historic Places in Albany County, New York